The 1985 III ACB International Tournament "II Memorial Héctor Quiroga" was the 3rd semi-official edition of the European Basketball Club Super Cup. It took place at Pabellón Municipal de Puerto Real, Puerto Real, Spain, on 6, 7 and 8 September 1985 with the participations of Real Madrid (runners-up of the 1984–85 FIBA European Champions Cup), Simac Milano (champions of the 1984–85 FIBA Korać Cup), Limoges CSP (champions of the 1984–85 Nationale 1) and Winston All Star a selective team from NCAA Division I men's basketball tournament.

League stage
Day 1, September 06, 1985

|}

Day 2, September 07, 1985

|}

Day 3, September 08, 1985

|}

Final standings 

European Basketball Club Super Cup
1985–86 in European basketball
1985–86 in Spanish basketball
1985–86 in Italian basketball
1985–86 in French basketball
1985–86 in American basketball
International basketball competitions hosted by Spain